South Korean rapper RM (formerly Rap Monster) has released one studio album, two mixtapes, and 18 singles (including 11 as a featured artist). He has recorded with a variety of artists throughout his career including Warren G, MFBTY, Primary, Wale, Fall Out Boy, Tiger JK, Honne, Lil Nas X, Younha, Erykah Badu, and Anderson .Paak.

RM's career began in 2010 when he signed to Big Hit Entertainment. He spent three years as a trainee at the label,  honing his skills as a rapper, musician, and songwriter—he co-wrote songs for 2AM and Glam during that time—frequently sharing songs he made or covered on SoundCloud via the label's official blog. He debuted as a member of BTS, with the stagename Rap Monster, in June 2013. His first solo track for the band was the rap intro from their debut extended play (EP), O!RUL8,2? (2013), released as a video trailer on YouTube in August of that year. He has since authored and performed three more solo songs in the band's repertoire: "Reflection" from Wings (2016), "Trivia: Love" from Love Yourself: Answer (2019), and "Persona" from Map of the Soul: Persona (2019).

Outside of his BTS-related work, the rapper released his first mixtape  RM in 2015, under his then-stagename Rap Monster. Three music videos were produced for the tracks "Awakening", "Do You", and "Joke" respectively. The mixtape was never released commercially or made available on streaming platforms. His second mixtape, Mono (2018), was the first full project released under his updated stagename RM, having officially changed it a year prior. Monos debut at number 26 on the Billboard 200 made him the highest-charting Korean soloist in the history of the chart at the time, a record he held until 2020 when bandmate Suga's second mixtape D-2 debuted at number 11. Four years later, he released his debut solo album Indigo. The project featured collaborations with Badu, Paak, Tablo of Epik High, and Youjeen of Cherry Filter, who provided vocals on the lead single "Wild Flower", among others. The album peaked at number three on the Billboard 200 and made him the highest-charting Korean soloist in Billboard chart history.

Albums

Mixtapes

Singles

As lead artist

As featured artist

Other charted songs

Other songs

Other appearances

Music videos 

Notes
 RM also makes an uncredited cameo in MFBTY's "Bang Diggy Bang Bang" music video, in a toilet scene that references his verse from the "BuckuBucku" music video.

Notes

References 

Discographies of South Korean artists